Sprinkle (スプリンクル) is the fifth studio album by Kiyotaka Sugiyama, released by Warner Pioneer on May 30, 1990. The album peaked on the Oricon charts at No. 1, Sugiyama's first No. 1 album since Realtime to Paradise in 1987.

Composition 
The album was his first after his transfer to Warner Music Japan in 1990 and includes the single "Itsumo Kimi o Omotteru."
The production was helped by Tom Keane of The Keane Brothers arranging all of the tracks, with him also playing keyboards for the album. Drummer John Robinson, guitarist Michael Landau and bassist Neil Stubenhaus were also apart of the backing band for the album with their sessions done in Los Angeles.

Track listing

Charts

References 

1990 albums
J-pop albums